The Brundidge Building is a historic commercial building on West Second Street in the commercial heart of Hope, Arkansas.  The -story brick building was erected in 1893 by J. P. Brundidge and is the city's best example of Romanesque Revival architecture.  Its main facade is divided into four bays. The rightmost bay projects slightly and is decorated at its corners with small turrets which flank a gable front.  This gable has a bank of windows in it consisting of paired sash windows flanking a segmented-arch window.

The building was listed on the National Register of Historic Places in 1990.

See also
National Register of Historic Places listings in Hempstead County, Arkansas

References

Commercial buildings on the National Register of Historic Places in Arkansas
Romanesque Revival architecture in Arkansas
Buildings and structures completed in 1893
Buildings and structures in Hempstead County, Arkansas
National Register of Historic Places in Hempstead County, Arkansas
Historic district contributing properties in Arkansas